Brazda or Brázda (Czech and Slovak feminine: Brázdová) may refer to:

People
 Amelie Posse-Brázdová (1884–1957), Swedish author
 Andrej Brázda-Jankovský (1915–2008), Slovak writer
 Bozidar Brazda (born 1972), Canadian artist
 Dalibor Brazda (1921–2005), Czech/Swiss music composer, arranger, and conductor
 Oskar Brázda (1887–1977), Czech painter and artist
 Rudolf Brazda (1913–2011), one of the last known survivors of homosexual deportation (Buchenwald concentration camp)
 Soňa Brázdová (born 1953), Czech gymnast
 Tia Brazda, Canadian singer

Places
 Brázda (cave), a cave in the Slovak Karst mountains in Slovakia
 Brazda, Čučer-Sandevo, a village in North Macedonia
 Stenkovec Brazda Airfield
 Brazda lui Novac, Roman limes in present-day Romania, known also as Constantine Wall

See also
 
 Brózda (Polish form)